O2 Slovakia, s.r.o. is a provider of mobile service in Slovakia. O2 started as Telefónica in Slovakia with commercial services on 2 February 2007 with about 600.000 preregistered users, and ~400,000 Slovaks actively using the O2 service.  The operator has 1 700 000 active SIM cards (3 month activity) to date 1 September 2015.  The company is subsidiary of O2 Czech Republic, itself owned by PPF.

Prefix
Users are identified by prefix 940, 944, 948 and 949 in mobile number. (+421 94x yyy yyy)

Headquarters
O2 Slovakia, s.r.o, Einsteinova 24, SK- 851 01 Bratislava, Bratislava, Slovakia

References

External links
 

Telecommunications companies of Slovakia
Telecommunications companies established in 2006